A silversmith is a metalworker who crafts objects from silver. The terms silversmith and goldsmith are not exactly synonyms as the techniques, training, history, and guilds are or were largely the same but the end product may vary greatly as may the scale of objects created.

History

In the ancient Near East the value of silver to gold was lower, allowing a silversmith to produce objects and store these as stock. Ogden states that according to an edict written by Diocletian in 301 A.D., a silversmith was able to charge 75, 100, 150, 200, 250, or 300 denarii for material produce (per Roman pound). At that time, guilds of silversmiths formed to arbitrate disputes, protect its members' welfare and educate the public of the trade.

Silversmiths in medieval Europe and England formed guilds and transmitted their tools and techniques to new generations via the apprentice tradition.  Silver working guilds often maintained consistency and upheld standards at the expense of innovation.  Beginning in the 17th century, artisans emigrated to America and experienced fewer restrictions.  As a result, silver working was one of the trades that helped to inaugurate the technological and industrial history of the United States silver-working shift to industrialization.

Very exquisite and distinctly designed silverware, that goes by the name of Swami Silver, emerged from the stable of watchmaker turned silversmith P Orr and Sons in the South Indian city of Madras (now Chennai) during the British rule in 1875.

The Beta Israel known more widely as the Falasha of Ethiopia were known for their silversmithing skills.

Tools, materials and techniques

saw (jeweler's saw)
snips
 flat file 
 jewelers' files
 planishing hammer
 raising hammer
 cross-pein hammer
 ball-pein hammer
anvils
stakes
swage blocks
riveting
silver hard-solder
flux
borax
boric acid
torch or blow-pipe
pickle (Dilute sulphuric acid or organic acids which are used to remove firescale)
buffing wheels
polishing compounds.
chasing
repoussé
engraving

Silversmiths saw or cut specific shapes from sterling and fine silver sheet metal and bar stock, and then use hammers to form the metal over anvils and stakes. Silver is hammered cold (at room temperature). As the metal is hammered, bent, and worked, it 'work-hardens'. Annealing is the heat-treatment used to make the metal soft again. If metal is work-hardened, and not annealed occasionally, the metal will crack and weaken the work.

Silversmiths can use casting techniques to create knobs, handles and feet for the hollowware they are making.

After forming and casting, the various pieces may be assembled by soldering and riveting.

During most of their history, silversmiths used charcoal or coke fired forges, and lung-powered blow-pipes for soldering and annealing. Modern silversmiths commonly use gas burning torches as heat sources. A newer method is laser beam welding.

Silversmiths may also work with copper and brass, especially when making practice pieces, due to those materials having similar working properties and being more affordable than silver.

Related and overlapping trades 

Although jewelers also work in silver and gold, and many of the techniques for working precious metals overlap, the trades of jeweler and Silversmith have distinct histories.
Chain-making and gem-setting are common practices of jewelers that are not usually considered aspects of silversmiths.

The tradition of making (iron / plate) armor was interrupted sometime after the 17th century. Silversmithing and goldsmithing, by contrast, have an unbroken tradition going back many millennia. The techniques used to make armor today (whether for movies or for historical recreation groups) are an amalgam of silversmith forming techniques and blacksmith iron-handling techniques.

Notable and historical silversmiths

Companies

 Garrard & Co
 Hersey & Son
 Phipps & Robinson
 Reid & Sons

People

 Acragas
 Kurt Aepli
Zahroun Amara, world renowned Mandaean niello silversmith. People that are known to have owned his silver nielloware include Stanley Maude, Winston Churchill, the Bahraini royal family, Egyptian King Farouk, the Iraqi royal family (including kings Faisal I and Ghazi), and the British royal family including the Prince of Wales who became Edward VIII.
 Hester Bateman
 Peter Bentzon, the only early-American silversmith of African-ancestry whose silver has been identified.
 Jocelyn Burton
 Benvenuto Cellini
 Stephen Emery, early American silversmith
 Thomas Germain
 François-Thomas Germain
 Karl Gustav Hansen, Danish pioneer of Scandinavian silversmith design
 John Hull, Treasurer of the Massachusetts Bay Colony
 Isaac Hutton
 Georg Jensen
 Sampson Mordan
 Jean-Valentin Morel, French jeweler and craftsman
 Henry Petzal
 Paul Revere, American silversmith, manufacturer, and patriot
 Joseph Richardson Sr. and Joseph Richardson Jr., American silversmiths based in Philadelphia
 Atsidi Sani (Old Smith in English), the first known Navajo silversmith
 Alfredo Sciarrotta
 Sequoyah, Cherokee silversmith, inventor of the Cherokee syllabary
 Alice Sheene
 Robert Shepherd and William Boyd
 Robert Welch
 Edward Winlsow, early American silversmith

See also 
 Yemenite silversmithing
 Mouza Sulaiman Mohamed Al-Wardi
 Goldsmith

Notes

References

External links

 Society of American Silversmiths
 Jeff Herman's comprehensive guide for professional silver care methods and products
 Staatliche Zeichenakademie Hanau (Silversmith)
Stamped silver button, made 1787 image from Victoria & Albert Museum jewellery collection.
 Gee, G. The silversmith's handbook : containing full instructions for the alloying and working of silver, including the different modes of refining and melting the metal; its solders; the preparation of imitation alloys...(1921.) 
 Wilson, H. Silverwork and jewelry : a text-book for students and workers in metal ( 1912.)
 Sampson Mordan
  

Arts occupations
Metalworking occupations